Union County Airport may refer to:

 Union County Airport (Ohio) in Union County, Ohio, United States (FAA: MRT)
 Union County Airport (South Carolina), also known as Troy Shelton Field, in Union County, South Carolina, United States (FAA: 35A)
 La Grande/Union County Airport, in Union County, Oregon, United States (FAA: LGD)
 New Albany-Union County Airport, in Union County, Mississippi, United States (FAA: M72)